Hidden is a BBC Audio original audiobook written by Steven Savile and based on the British science fiction television, Doctor Who spin-off series Torchwood. It was released on 4 February 2008. The story is set during the first series of the show.

Plot introduction
A secret is buried in the heart of the Welsh countryside and a series of violent deaths that seem to point the finger of blame at Captain Jack Harkness. Can the team solve the riddle in time to prove Jack's innocence?

Featuring
 Jack Harkness
 Gwen Cooper
 Owen Harper
 Toshiko Sato
 Ianto Jones

References

Audiobooks based on Torchwood